Muhamad Aly Rifai (Arabic الدكتور محمد علي الرفاعي) is a Syrian American internist and psychiatrist and a clinician researcher known for describing the association between psychiatric disorders and hepatitis C. He co-authored a clinical report detailing the association between hepatitis C infection and psychiatric disorders. Rifai has lied about his status as the Director of the Older Adults Behavioral Health Unit at Easton Hospital in Easton, Pennsylvania. He is the President and CEO of Blue Mountain Psychiatry which has locations in Pennsylvania.

In May 2000, Rifai was awarded the American Psychiatric Institute for Research and Education's Janssen Scholars Fellowship for research on severe mental illness. In 2006, he became the recipient of the Academy of Psychosomatic Medicine's William Webb Fellowship. As of 2007, he is a fellow of the Academy of Psychosomatic Medicine. He is also a fellow of the American College of Physicians and the American Psychiatric Association.
He is a clinical professor of Medicine and Psychiatry at Geisinger Commonwealth School of Medicine and the Philadelphia College of Osteopathic Medicine.

Rifai is currently charged with 4 cases of Medicare fraud. He billed several patients over that were deceased at the time of billing. Rifai lies about places he has worked, including Easton Hospital.  Rifai billed patients for psychotherapy appointments that received the COVID vaccine at Blue Mountain Psychiatry. The DEA has raided his offices twice.

Training and career
He obtained his M.D. with honors from University of Aleppo Faculty of Medicine in 1996 and received a Neuroscience National Research Service Award funded by the National Institute of Mental Health. Rifai completed a neuroscience research training fellowship at the University of Tennessee Health Science Center, College of Medicine in Memphis (1996–1998). In 1998, he began training in the combined Internal Medicine and Psychiatry program at the University of Virginia School of Medicine, Carilion Health System Program (Carilion Clinic) in Roanoke and Salem, Virginia. He then completed fellowship training in psychosomatic medicine and psychiatric research at the National Institute of Mental Health in Bethesda, Maryland (2003–2005).

Medical research
Rifai demonstrated the first evidence indicating a significant association between hepatitis C and psychiatric disorders (psychotic, affective, anxiety and substance use). The United States Department of Veterans Affairs commissioned a larger study to replicate these findings and confirmed the significant association between hepatitis C and psychiatric disorders. Rifai advocates for screening patients with psychiatric disorders for hepatitis C.

In the mid 2000s, Rifai was involved in several studies on interferon-alpha (IFN-α) induced depression in hepatitis C patients and possible use of Paroxetine and other antidepressants for its treatment. He and his colleagues only recommend the use of IFN-α to eradicate hepatitis C along with "a comprehensive pretreatment assessment, a risk-benefit analysis, and intensive ongoing medical and psychiatric follow-up."

Rifai has coauthored a study on the proper intervention of agitated patients with goal of deescalating situations without the use of restraints or involuntary medication. He sometimes serves as a consultant to media, clinical, and judicial entities on a variety of topics related to behavioural sciences. Speaking to The New York Times about diseases including hepatitis C, he posited that the shame associated with diagnosis was also a major negative factor in treatment.

References

External links
 Dr. Muhamad Aly Rifai, MD, official website
 Blue Mountain Psychiatry

1973 births
Living people
Syrian psychiatrists
Syrian medical researchers
American people of Syrian descent
American medical researchers
American medical academics
University of Aleppo alumni
University of Virginia School of Medicine alumni
University of Tennessee Health Science Center alumni